Franz Kurzreiter (10 December 1944 – 14 December 2022) was an Austrian politician. A member of the Austrian People's Party, he served in the Landtag of Lower Austria from 1986 to 2003.

Kurzreiter died on 14 December 2022, at the age of 78.

References

1944 births
2022 deaths
Austrian farmers
Austrian People's Party politicians
Members of the Landtag of Lower Austria
People from Horn District